Alacepril (INN) is an ACE inhibitor medication indicated as a treatment for hypertension. The medication metabolizes to captopril and desacetylalacepril.

References

External links

ACE inhibitors
Carboxamides
Enantiopure drugs
Pyrrolidines